The Dr. Tappan Eustis Francis House is a historic house at 35 Davis Avenue in Brookline, Massachusetts.  Built in 1877–78, the -story house is a well-preserved rendering of Queen Anne styling in brick.  Its roof has varying patterns of slate tiles, and the facade has a variety of brickwork decorations.  Its chimneys feature Panel brick design elements, and it has a Stick style porch. The house was built for a doctor who served the town for 50 years.

The house was listed on the National Register of Historic Places in 1985.

See also
National Register of Historic Places listings in Brookline, Massachusetts

References

Queen Anne architecture in Massachusetts
Houses completed in 1878
Houses in Brookline, Massachusetts
National Register of Historic Places in Brookline, Massachusetts
Houses on the National Register of Historic Places in Norfolk County, Massachusetts